Compsoctena rudis is a moth in the family Eriocottidae. It was described by Edward Meyrick in 1921. It is found in Mozambique, South Africa and Zimbabwe.

The wingspan is 17–18 mm. The forewings are light fuscous, thinly speckled with darker and with an obscure whitish dot on the end of the cell. The hindwings are grey.

References

Moths described in 1921
Compsoctena
Lepidoptera of Mozambique
Lepidoptera of South Africa
Lepidoptera of Zimbabwe
Moths of Sub-Saharan Africa